George Clay may refer to:

 Sir George Clay, 3rd Baronet (1831–1878), of the Clay baronets
 Sir George Felix Neville Clay, 5th Baronet (1871–1941), of the Clay baronets
 George H. Clay (1911–1995), president of the Federal Reserve Bank of Kansas City, 1961–1976

See also
 George Clay Ginty (1840–1890), politician, military officer, newspaperman, and U.S. Marshal